KUKY 95.9 FM is a Spanish language radio station licensed to Wellton, Arizona.  The station airs a Regional Mexican format, and is owned by Hispanic Target Media, Inc.

References

External links
 KUKY's official website
 

Mexican-American culture in Arizona
UKY
Regional Mexican radio stations in the United States
UKY